

Henry Wadsworth Longfellow (1807–1882) was an American poet.

Longfellow may also refer to:

People
 Longfellow (surname)
 Andy Kim (singer) (born 1952), Canadian singer-songwriter of Lebanese origin, a.k.a. Baron Longfellow or just Longfellow
 Lester Piggott (born 1935), British jockey who was given the nickname "The Long Fellow" due to his large stature compared to other jockeys

Places
 Longfellow, Minneapolis, United States
 Longfellow (neighborhood), Minneapolis, United States
 Longfellow, Oakland, California, United States

Others
 Longfellow (horse) (1867–1893), an American racehorse
 Longfellow Deeds, a character in the 1936 film Mr. Deeds Goes to Town and the 2002 remake Mr. Deeds
 "Longfellow", a song by Days Of The New from their album Days of the New

See also
 Longfellow Elementary School (disambiguation)
 Longfellow Middle School (disambiguation)
 Longfellow National Historic Site
 
 Éamon de Valera (1882–1975), Irish statesman nicknamed "The Long Fellow"